Parabacteroides chartae  is a Gram-negative, obligately anaerobic and non-motile bacterium from the genus of Parabacteroides which has been isolated from wastewater from a paper mill in Lingqiao in China.

References 

Bacteroidia
Bacteria described in 2012